Jonathan Tetteh Quarcoo (born 13 October 1996 in Bodø) is a Norwegian sprinter.

He won the European Team Championships 2017, 1st League, in 100 m. He also represented his country at the 2017 World Championships narrowly missing the semifinals in 200m, and won a bronze medal at the 2017 European U23 Championships.

International competitions

1Disqualified in the final

Personal bests
Outdoor
100 metres – 10.26 (+0.8 m/s, Bydgoszcz 2017)
200 metres – 20.39 (+0.9 m/s, Bydgoszcz 2017)
Indoor
60 metres – 6.76 (Rud 2016)
200 metres – 21.79 (Bærum 2014)

External links
 
 http://www.european-athletics.org/athletes/group=q/athlete=100734-quarcoo-jonathan/index.html
 http://www.all-athletics.com/node/772718

1996 births
Living people
Norwegian male sprinters
World Athletics Championships athletes for Norway
Sportspeople from Bodø